Verin Shorzha is a village in the Vardenis Municipality of the Gegharkunik Province of Armenia. Verin Shorzha and the nearby Nerkin Shorzha are both reached by a short drive from Ayrk.

History 
Originally, the village was completely Armenian. Azerbaijanis moved in around 1928, and left during the outbreak of the Nagorno-Karabakh conflict.

References

External links 

Populated places in Gegharkunik Province